Christoffer Eriksson (born 25 May 1990) is a Swedish former footballer who played as a defender.

References

External links
 

1990 births
Living people
Association football defenders
AIK Fotboll players
AFC Eskilstuna players
Degerfors IF players
Allsvenskan players
Superettan players
Swedish footballers
Vasalunds IF players
Assyriska FF players